Agnes Ellinor Knochenhauer (born 5 May 1989) is a Swedish curler who competed at 5 World Curling Championships and at the 2014 Winter Olympics in Sochi and 2018 Winter Olympics in Pyeongchang, winning a silver and a gold medal respectively.

Career

Junior career
In 2009, Knochenhauer played at the 2009 World Junior Curling Championships as third for the Anna Hasselborg rink. Sweden finished with a 4–5 record and a 6th-place finish. At the 2010 World Junior Curling Championships, Sweden upset the Canadian rink skipped by Rachel Homan in the final by a score of 8–3.

At the 2013 Winter Universiade, Knochenhauer and her team had a 5th-place finish.

Women's career
Knochenhauer has graduated from the junior level and has won three tour events in her career, the 2011 Glynhill Ladies International, the 2016 Oakville OCT Fall Classic, and the 2016 Stockholm Ladies Curling Cup.

In 2013, Knochenhauer was the alternate for the Margaretha Sigfridsson rink at the 2013 World Women's Curling Championship. Sweden made it all the way to the final, where they lost 6–5 to Scotland's Eve Muirhead. The Swedish team finished 5th at the 2014 European Curling Championships.

In February 2018, her team of Anna Hasselborg, Sara McManus, and Sofia Mabergs won the gold medal at the 2018 Winter Olympics in PyeongChang, defeating Kim Eun-jung in the final. The next month, the rink made it to the final of the 2018 Ford World Women's Curling Championship, but they lost in an extra end to Canada's Jennifer Jones.

Knochenhauer won her first Grand Slam in the inaugural women's Elite 10 in 2018, going undefeated through the tournament and defeating Silvana Tirinzoni in the final. At the 2018 Masters, the Hasselborg rink won their second straight slam, defeating Rachel Homan in the final. The team lost the world final once again at the 2019 World Women's Curling Championship, this time to Silvana Tirinzoni.

Team Hasselborg began the 2019–20 season at the Stu Sells Oakville Tankard, where they defeated Anna Sidorova in the final. They missed the playoffs at the 2019 AMJ Campbell Shorty Jenkins Classic after going 2–2 in the round robin. They defended their title at the 2019 European Curling Championships. Down 4–3 in the tenth end of the final to Scotland's Eve Muirhead, Hasselborg made a runback on her final stone to score two and win. In Grand Slam play, Team Hasselborg were the most dominant team on the women's side, winning them the 2019–20 Pinty's Cup. They lost in the semifinal of the Masters to Tracy Fleury before winning the next three Slams, the Tour Challenge, National and the Canadian Open. The team was set to represent Sweden at the 2020 World Women's Curling Championship before the event got cancelled due to the COVID-19 pandemic. The Canadian Open would be their last event of the season as both the Players' Championship and the Champions Cup Grand Slam events were also cancelled due to the pandemic. Also during the season, Knochenhauer paired up with Rasmus Wranå for the Swedish Mixed Doubles Curling Championship which they won. They were going to compete at the 2020 World Mixed Doubles Curling Championship, but that event was also cancelled.

The Hasselborg rink won the first event of the 2020–21 season, defeating Raphaela Keiser in the final of the 2020 Women's Masters Basel. Next, they played Team Wranå in the Sweden National Challenge in December 2020, where they lost 17–12. A "curling bubble" was set up in Calgary, Canada in the spring, which hosted several events, including the 2021 World Women's Curling Championship and two slams. Team Hasselborg competed in both the 2021 Champions Cup and the 2021 Players' Championship, finishing 0–4 at the Champions Cup and reaching the semifinals of the Players'. The following week, the team represented Sweden at the Worlds. They finished third through the round robin with a 10–3 record, qualifying them for the playoffs. After defeating Canada's Kerri Einarson 8–3 in the qualification round, they lost a narrow 8–7 semifinal against the RCF, skipped by Alina Kovaleva. This put them in the bronze medal game, which they lost 9–5 to the Tabitha Peterson rink of the United States. On June 4, 2021, Team Hasselborg was selected as the Olympic Team for the 2022 Winter Olympics.

Team Hasselborg began the 2021–22 season competing in the men's Baden Masters tour event, where they missed the playoffs. At the 2021 Women's Masters Basel, the team made it all the way to the final, where they lost to Denmark's Madeleine Dupont. Next, they played in the 2021 Masters Grand Slam event, where they again missed the playoffs. They were able to rebound at the 2021 National, however, claiming the title with a 9–6 victory over Tracy Fleury in the final game. In November, Team Hasselborg again represented Sweden at the 2021 European Curling Championships where they finished third in the round robin with a 7–2 record. They then defeated Russia's Alina Kovaleva in the semifinal before dropping the final to Scotland's Eve Muirhead, settling for silver. The next event for Team Hasselborg was the 2022 Winter Olympics, where they attempted to defend their gold medal from 2018. The team placed second after the round robin preliminary stage with a 7–2 record. This earned them a semifinal berth where they would face Great Britain's Muirhead rink. In one of the highest-scoring games in curling, Muirhead scored a single point in the extra end to win 12–11, ending Hasselborg's chances of repeating as Olympic gold medallists. They did still earn a medal from the Games, however, as they were able to beat Switzerland's Silvana Tirinzoni rink 9–7 in the bronze medal game. Next for the Swedish rink was the 2022 World Women's Curling Championship, where they finished fourth in the round robin with a 9–3 record. They then defeated the United States Cory Christensen in the qualification game before dropping the semifinal and bronze medal games to Switzerland and Canada, respectively, placing fourth. Team Hasselborg wrapped up their season at the final two Slams of the season, the 2022 Players' Championship and the 2022 Champions Cup. At the Players', the team began with two straight losses before rattling off six straight victories to claim the event title. With the victory, Team Hasselborg became the first women's team to win a career Grand Slam (winning all four 'majors'). At the Champions Cup, they went undefeated up until the semifinal round where they were eliminated by Kerri Einarson.

In 2016 she was inducted into the Swedish Curling Hall of Fame.

Personal life
Knochenhauer is married to Peter Fransson and has one daughter. She works as a project manager. She lives in Lidingö, a suburb of Stockholm.

Grand Slam record

Former events

References

External links

1989 births
Living people
Curlers at the 2014 Winter Olympics
Curlers at the 2018 Winter Olympics
Curlers at the 2022 Winter Olympics
Swedish female curlers
Olympic curlers of Sweden
Sportspeople from Stockholm
Olympic gold medalists for Sweden
Olympic silver medalists for Sweden
Olympic bronze medalists for Sweden
Olympic medalists in curling
Medalists at the 2014 Winter Olympics
Medalists at the 2018 Winter Olympics
Medalists at the 2022 Winter Olympics
Continental Cup of Curling participants
European curling champions
Swedish curling champions
People from Lidingö Municipality
21st-century Swedish women